Ramsay is the name of noble family of Scottish origin. The family members bear the title of Baron in the Finnish nobility.

Notable members 
Anders Edvard Ramsay , (1799 — 1877), was a Scottish-Russian general of infantry, adjutant general of Russian Empire Army, who served on the Baltic theater of the Crimean War.
Georg Eduardovich Ramsay , (1834 — 1918), was a general of infantry, adjutant general of Russian Empire Army, commander of the 3rd Battalion of the Imperial Finland Guard Regiment during the Russo-Turkish War (1877–1878). Since 1877 commander of Lifeguard Semyonovsky Regiment

References

Russian noble families
Russian families of Scottish origin
Finnish noble families
Clan Ramsay